The 2014 Hungaroring GP3 Series round was a GP3 Series motor race held on 26 and 27 July 2014 at the Hungaroring in Mogyoród, Pest, Hungary. It was the fiveth round of the 2014 GP3 Series. The race weekend supported the 2014 Hungarian Grand Prix.

Classification

Qualifying

Feature Race

See also 
 2014 Hungarian Grand Prix
 2014 Hungaroring GP2 Series round

References

External links 
 Official website of GP3 Series

Hungaroring
GP3